A pard is an animal from medieval bestiaries.

Pard may also refer to:

 Pard Pearce (1896–1974), American football quarterback, first starting quarterback of the Chicago Bears
 parD, a plasmid anti-toxin - see ParDE type II toxin-antitoxin system
 Pard, gangster Roy Earle's dog in the 1941 film High Sierra

See also
 Metator pardalinus, a grasshopper species also known as the pard grasshopper
 Parde, a synonym for Malbec
 Pardes (disambiguation)